is a chokehold in judo.  It is one of the twelve constriction techniques of Kodokan Judo in the
Shime-waza list.  In The Canon Of Judo, it is called Katate-Juji-Jime.

The technique is called a 'half cross strangle' because the palm of one hand of the person applying the choke is facing the person who is applying the choke and the back of other hand is facing the person applying the choke. The hands are high up each side of the neck. Scissoring the hands applies pressure to the carotid arteries reducing blood flow, rapidly resulting in loss of consciousness. In judo, this technique is always taught under supervision and is similarly closely observed by referees in competition.

Gallery

Similar techniques, variants, and aliases

variants 
 Paper cutter choke
 Bat jime(Baseball bat choke, Baseball choke, バット絞)
Chokehold handed down by Kokuji Honda(born in 1925) to the Judo Club of Tohoku University.

Similar techniques 
Nami-Juji-Jime
Gyaku-Juji-Jime

Aliases 
 Cross choke
 X choke

See also
The Canon Of Judo

References

External links
Graphic from JudoInfo.com 
Demonstration from YouTube.com

Judo technique
Grappling
Grappling hold
Grappling positions
Martial art techniques